Eugene McGovern (born 25 May 1982) is an Irish rugby union player, playing in the prop position. He played for Munster from 2002 until 2007, making his debut for Munster against Newport Gwent Dragons in October 2003.  From Limerick, McGovern was educated at Crescent College.

References

1982 births
Living people
Irish rugby union players
Rugby union props
Munster Rugby players
Garryowen Football Club players
Rugby union players from County Limerick
People educated at Crescent College